Tha Last Meal is the fifth studio album by American rapper Snoop Dogg. It was released on December 19, 2000. It was his third and final studio album released on No Limit, his first album on his newly founded label Doggy Style in the United States, and as referenced in the album title, his last record partially owned by his former label Death Row Records. The album was produced by Dr. Dre, Timbaland and Soopafly, among others. The album included the singles "Snoop Dogg (What's My Name Pt. 2)", "Lay Low", "Loosen' Control" and "Wrong Idea". The album was generally met with positive reception with many critics citing it as one his best albums.

Background
The single "Snoop Dogg (What's My Name II)" was nominated for Music Video of the Year at The Source Hip-Hop Music Awards 2001. The album was nominated Album of the Year at the same ceremony.

The single "Wrong Idea" was also included in Bad Azz's second album Personal Business released on Doggystyle. The video for the single was also attributed as a Bad Azz track that featured Snoop. Tha Last Meal was the final album from Snoop on No Limit Records.

Critical reception

Rolling Stone - 3.5 stars out of 5 - "[His] strongest album since 1993's Doggystyle...Snoop's chronic-marinated flow, all menthol-cool and deadpan droop, sounds as smooth as ever."

Spin - 6 out of 10 - "This Meal finds him riding the Dre cache, trying to convince us he's still 'G'ed-up from the feet up'.... Timbaland stuttering out the obvious singles...but Dre's laconic thumps-by-the-pound anchor most of the album."

Vibe - 3.5 discs out of 5 - "Deeply steeped in P-funkology....these days, Snoop's songs are simply fun to listen to....nothing groundbreaking, just good solid Snoop-rap."

Commercial performance 
Tha Last Meal debuted at number nine on the US Billboard 200 chart, selling 397,000 copies in its first week, marking the highest debut of the week. It serves as Snoop Dogg's fifth consecutive top-ten album in the United States. In its second week, the album jumped to number five on the Billboard 200, selling 248,000 copies. in the third week, the album reached its peak position, reaching the number four in the Billboard 200, selling 164,000 copies. The album spent four consecutive weeks on the top-ten of the Billboard 200. It serves as Snoop's fifth consecutive album to debut at number one on the US Top R&B/Hip-Hop Albums and remained at top for four consecutive weeks. On February 26, 2001, Tha Last Meal was certified Platinum by the Recording Industry Association of America (RIAA) for selling over 1 million copies in the United States. In the year of 2001, the album it selling 1.27 million copies, ranking as the 68th best-selling album of the year. As of March 2008, the album sales 2.068 million copies in the United States, marking the third best-selling album by Snoop Dogg's in the country, behind Doggystyle (1993) and Da Game Is to Be Sold, Not to Be Told (1998).

Track listing

Charts

Weekly charts

Year-end charts

Certifications

See also
List of number-one R&B albums of 2001 (U.S.)

References

External links
 Music Video Database
 

2000 albums
Snoop Dogg albums
Albums produced by Battlecat (producer)
Albums produced by Dr. Dre
Albums produced by JellyRoll
Albums produced by Scott Storch
Albums produced by Timbaland
Albums produced by Soopafly
Albums produced by Studio Ton
Albums produced by Mike Elizondo
No Limit Records albums
Priority Records albums
Doggystyle Records albums